The Styrsö class is a Swedish mine countermeasures vessel built from glass fiber. Among its intended missions are mine detection, mine hunting and patrolling. The ships are named after islands from four different archipelagos of Sweden. In 2004 HMS Spårö and HMS Sturkö were modernised, pulling out some of their capability for traditional mine clearance in favour of extended human dive support, the modified vessels are occasionally called Spårö class.

Description 
The ships are equipped for acoustic, magnetic and mechanical mine clearance. There is also an underwater vehicle type Uven and a Towed array sonar on board. It is also possible to manoeuvre the remote controlled mine clearance system SAM from the ships.

The Styrsö class ships have very good manoeuvring properties and are used for hunting bottom mines, traditional mine sweeping and operates in coastal waters. They carry underwater ROVs of the type Uven and are prepared for the next generation of rovs called ROV S.

The class is built exclusively with civilian technology, so called (COTS), everything from diesel engines to the computers on board have been bought from the civilian market. This method simplifies the procedure of upgrading the system, it is also very cost effective eliminating the need to develop new expensive military systems. The ships have a completely integrated command and navigation system with computer communication and projection of charts in a 3D environment.

History 
The class consists of four ships that were built from 1996 to 1997. They are among the most modern mine countermeasures ships in the world and an important addition to the Swedish mine clearance ability.

In 2004 HMS Spårö and HMS Sturkö were modernised, pulling out some of their capability for traditional mine clearance in favour of extended human dive support, the modified vessels are occasionally called Spårö class.

Units

References 
 Minröjningsfartyget Styrsö - Försvarsmakten 
 Örlogsboken 2003 

Mine warfare vessels of the Swedish Navy
Mine warfare vessel classes